The Fayette County Courthouse Square Historic District in La Grange, Texas is a historic district roughly bounded by Main, Lafayette, Franklin, Colorado, Jefferson, Washington, and Crockett Streets. It was listed on the National Register of Historic Places on January 16, 2001. Two notable buildings in the district are the Fayette County Courthouse and Jail. Forty–seven buildings, three structures and four objects were identified as contributing to the historic nature of the district.

Contributing properties
A partial list of contributing properties:

See also

National Register of Historic Places listings in Fayette County, Texas

Photo gallery

References

External links
 

Historic districts on the National Register of Historic Places in Texas
Fayette County, Texas
National Register of Historic Places in Fayette County, Texas